Caenocholax is a genus of twisted-winged insects in the family Myrmecolacidae. There are about nine described species in Caenocholax.

Species
These nine species belong to the genus Caenocholax:
 Caenocholax barkleyi Antell & Kathirithamby, 2016
 Caenocholax brasiliensis Oliveira & Kogan, 1959
 Caenocholax brodzinsky Kathirithamby & Grimaldi, 1993
 Caenocholax brodzinskyi Kathirithamby & Grimaldi, 1993
 Caenocholax dominicensis Kathirithamby & Grimaldi, 1993
 Caenocholax fenyesi Pierce, 1909 (Fenyes' strepsiptera)
 Caenocholax groehni Kathirithamby & Henderickx, 2008
 Caenocholax palusaxus Antell & Kathirithamby, 2016
 Caenocholax vilhenai Luna de Carvalho, 1956

References

Further reading

External links

 

Strepsiptera
Articles created by Qbugbot